Rear Admiral Philipose George Pynumootil, AVSM, NM is a former flag officer of the Indian Navy. He last served as the Flag Officer Naval Aviation and Flag officer Goa Naval Area. He previously served as the Assistant Chief of Naval Staff (Air) at Naval headquarters. He superannuated on 30 April 2022.

Early life and education
Pynumootil was born to Pynumootil Simon George, a fighter pilot in the Indian Air Force, and Glory George. George rose to the rank of Air Marshal and last served as Inspector General (Inspection & Safety) at Air headquarters. Philipose's elder brother Simon joined the Indian Navy and trained as a naval aviator. Simon was killed when the Britten-Norman BN-2 Islander aircraft he was piloting crashed, in May 1985. His sister Sara is married to Brigadier Chacko Ipe, a former Indian Army Armoured Corps officer from 64th Cavalry.

Pynumootil attended the Lawrence School, Lovedale where he completed his schooling. He then joined the 67th course of the National Defence Academy, Pune.

Naval career 

Pynumootil was commissioned into the Indian Navy on 1 January 1986. He trained as a Naval aviator, following his brother and father who were both pilots. He qualified as a helicopter pilot on the Westland Sea King and the Aérospatiale Alouette III (HAL Chetak). He served as the Flight Commander on board INS Delhi. He was a senior pilot in the Marine Commando Flight and in INAS 330. He flew extensively during Operation Pawan in Sri Lanka in 1990. In 1993, he served in Somalia, flying helicopters during Operation Restore Hope.

Pynumootil attended the Defence Services Staff College in Wellington. He subsequently commanded 1241 RE corvette and the Veer-class corvette . He also commanded the Khukri-class corvette  and the carrier-borne anti-submarine warfare (ASW) Sea King squadron INAS 330. He subsequently attended the Higher Air Command course at the College of Air Warfare, Secunderabad.

Pynumootil also commanded the lead ship of her class of guided missile frigates . For his command of the Brahmaputra, he was awarded the Nau Sena Medal. He also served as the executive officer of the lead ship of her class of guided missile destroyers . He then attended the Royal College of Defence Studies, London where he obtained a Master of Arts degree in International Relations from King's College London. He was appointed the commissioning commanding officer of the naval air station INS Shikra. Located in Colaba, Mumbai, INS Shikra is a heliport was commissioned on 22 January 2009.

In October 2011, Pynumootil moved to naval headquarters as the Principal Director of Aircraft Acquisition. He had a long tenure of three-and-a-half years, serving till May 2015.

Flag rank
In June 2015, Pynumootil was promoted to the rank of rear admiral and took over as the Assistant Chief of Naval Staff - Air (ACNS Air) at Naval HQ. In the six years that he spent as Principal Director aircraft acquisition and ACNS (Air), 8 Boeing P-8 Poseidon, 45 Mikoyan MiG-29K and 17 BAE Systems Hawk were inducted into the Indian Navy.

In February 2018, he was appointed Flag Officer Naval Aviation (FONA). During this tenure he also dual-hats as the Flag Officer Goa Area (FOGA). For his tenure as FONA and FOGA, he was awarded the Ati Vishisht Seva Medal on 26 January 2021.

Awards and decorations

References 

Indian Navy admirals
Recipients of the Ati Vishisht Seva Medal
National Defence Academy (India) alumni
Helicopter pilots
Living people
Year of birth missing (living people)
Indian naval aviators
Graduates of the Royal College of Defence Studies
Recipients of the Nau Sena Medal
College of Air Warfare alumni
Defence Services Staff College alumni